The 491st Attack Squadron is an active United States Air Force regular associate unit, stationed at Hancock Field Air National Guard Base, where it was activated in April 2019. It is assigned to the 49th Wing at Holloman Air Force Base, New Mexico and operates General Atomics MQ-9 Reaper unmanned aerial vehicles.

The first predecessor of the squadron was activated during World War I as the 79th Aero Squadron. It deployed to France in 1917 and was redesignated the 491st Aero Squadron. It served as a construction unit before returning to the United States, where it was demobilized in 1919.

The second predecessor of the unit is the 491st Bombardment Squadron, which was constituted as an Organized Reserve unit in 1924. It was activated in 1925 at Sand Point Airport, Washington, but was only nominally manned.  The two squadrons were consolidated in 1936, but the consolidated unit was inactivated the following year. it was disbanded in May 1942, as were all the other United States Army Air Corps Organized Reserve units.

The third predecessor of the unit is the 491st Bombardment Squadron (Medium), which was constituted and activated in India during World War II.  It participated in combat in the China-Burma-India Theater until the end of the war, where it earned a Distinguished Unit Citation.  Following V-J Day,  it returned to the United States and was inactivated.

The squadron was activated in the reserve in 1947, but was discontinued when Continental Air Command reorganized its reserve units under the wing base organization plan and reduced their number due to budget constraints.  In 1958, it was consolidated with the first two squadrons and activated at Dyess Air Force Base, Texas when Strategic Air Command expanded its Boeing B-47 Stratojet wings to four squadrons.  The squadron was inactivated at Dyess in 1961.

History

World War I
The first predecessor of the squadron was organized as the 79th Aero Squadron at Kelly Field, Texas in August 1917.  It deployed to the Aviation Concentration Center in Garden City, New York in November for shipment to France.  It arrived in France the following month and moved to Saint-Nazaire, where it was redesignated the 491st Aero Squadron (Construction) and constructed and maintained facilities from February until December 1918. It returned to the United States in January 1919 and was demobilized.  It was reconstituted c. 16 October 1936 and consolidated with the 491st Bombardment Squadron.

Organized Reserves between World War I and World War II
The 492d Bombardment Squadron was authorized in the Organized Reserves in March 1924.  It was activated at Sand Point Airport, Washington in the Ninth Corps Area the following January and assigned to the 349th Bombardment Group.  The squadron was only nominally manned before it was inactivated in the spring of 1937.  Along with all other United States Army Air Corps Organized Reserve units, it was disbanded in May 1942.  In August 1958 it was reconstituted and consolidated with the 492d Bombardment Squadron, Medium.

World War II
The 491st Bombardment Squadron (Medium) was activated in September 1942 as a North American B-25 Mitchell bomber squadron at Karachi, India.  It was assigned to the newly activated 341st Bombardment Group of Tenth Air Force.  The squadron did not receive a full complement of aircraft and personnel until the end of the year. After moving to Chakulia Airfield, the squadron began combat operations, flying its first mission on 10 January 1943.  For the remainder of the year the squadron was primarily tasked with interdicting Japanese lines of communication in Burma.

The squadron was transferred to Fourteenth Air Force and moved to China in January 1944. Again the squadron's primary tasking was interdiction of Japanese lines of communication in China and eastern French Indochina (now Vietnam).  In addition to strikes against airfields, bivouac and storage areas and bridges, the unit performed target of opportunity sweeps along roads, rivers and over the Gulf of Tonkin and the South China Sea.

When Japan surrendered, sixteen squadron aircrews and several aircraft maintenance personnel were in India undergoing transition training to Douglas A-26 Invader.  About 31 August 1945 the remaining 491st personnel joined those in India. Those determined to meet rotation requirements embarked on a transport ship and returned to the United States, arriving on 1 November.  The squadron was inactivated at Camp Kilmer, New Jersey on 2 November 1945.

Cold War
The unit was redesignated 491st Bombardment Squadron, Light on 26 May 1947 and activated in the reserve on 5 June.  The squadron was inactivated on 27 June 1949 when Continental Air Command reorganized its operational reserve units under the wing base organizational model.

The squadron was redesignated 491st Bombardment Squadron, Medium on 20 August 1958 and consolidated with the 491st Bombardment Squadron.   It was activated on 1 November and assigned to the 341st Bombardment Wing at Dyess Air Force Base operating the Boeing B-47 Stratojet.  In March 1961, President John F. Kennedy directed that the phaseout of the B-47 be accelerated. The squadron was inactivated on 25 June 1961 as part of that draw down, and its aircraft were sent to storage at Davis–Monthan Air Force Base, Arizona.

Lineage
491st Aero Squadron
 Organized as the 79th Aero Squadron on 15 August 1917
 Redesignated 491st Aero Squadron (Construction) on 1 February 1918
 Demobilized on 31 January 1919
 Reconstituted and consolidated 5 December 1936 with the 491st Bombardment Squadron

491st Bombardment Squadron
 Constituted as the 491st Bombardment Squadron in the Organized Reserve on 31 March 1924
 Activated in January 1925
 Consolidated 5 December 1936 with the 491st Aero Squadron
 Inactivated on 2 March 1937
 Disbanded on 31 May 1942
 Reconstituted and consolidated on 20 August 1958 with the 491st Bombardment Squadron, Medium

491st Attack Squadron
 Constituted as the 491st Bombardment Squadron (Medium) on 14 August 1942
 Activated on 15 September 1942
 Redesignated 491st Bombardment Squadron, Medium c. 1 August 1943
 Inactivated on 2 November 1945
 Redesignated 491st Bombardment Squadron, Light on 26 May 1947
 Activated in the reserve on 5 June 1947
 Inactivated on 27 June 1949
 Redesignated 491st Bombardment Squadron, Medium on 20 August 1958 and consolidated with the 491st Bombardment Squadron
 Activated on 1 November 1958
 Discontinued and inactivated on 25 June 1961
 Redesignated 491st Attack Squadron on 26 March 2019
 Activated on 15 April 2019

Assignments
 Unknown, 15 August–December 1917
 Seventh Aviation Instruction Center, December 1917 – December 1918
 Unknown, December 1918 – 31 January 1919
 349th Bombardment Group, January 1925 – 2 March 1937
 341st Bombardment Group, 15 September 1942 – 2 November 1945
 341st Bombardment Group, 5 June 1947 – 27 June 1949
 341st Bombardment Wing, 1 November 1958 – 25 June 1961.
 49 Operations Group, 15 April 2019 – present

Stations

 Kelly Field, Texas, 15 August 1917
 Garden City, New York, New York, 3–22 November 1917
 Aulnat (near Clermont-Ferrand), France, 18 December 1917
 St. Nazaire, France, c. 30 December 1918 – c. 12 January 1919
 Garden City, New York, c. 23–31 January 1919.
 Sand Point Airport, Washington, January 1925 – 2 March 1937
 Karachi Airport, India, 15 September 1942

 Chakulia Airfield, India, 5 January 1943 –  7 January 1944 (detachment of ground personnel at Gya, India, 20 July – 10 September 1943)
 Yangkai Airfield, China, 10 January 1944 – 13 September 1945 (detachments operated from Kweilin Airfield and Liuchow Airfield, China, 13 June – 10 July 1944 and 29 August – 2 November 1944)
 Camp Kilmer, New Jersey, 1 November 1945 – 2 November 1945
 New Haven, Connecticut, 5 June 1947 – 27 June 1949
 Dyess Air Force Base, Texas, 1 November 1958 – 25 June 1961
 Hancock Field Air National Guard Base, New York , 15 April 2019 – present

Aircraft
 North American B-25 Mitchell, 1942–1945
 Douglas A-26 Invader, 1945
 Boeing B-47 Stratojet, 1958–1961

See also

References

Notes
 Explanatory notes

 Citations

Bibliography

 
 
 
 
 
 
 Official History Summaries of 491st Bombardment Squadron (M), on file, Air Force Historical Research Agency, Maxwell AFB, Alabama.

External links

List of B-47 units of the United States Air Force

Attack squadrons of the United States Air Force